Sunil Mukherjee (November 16, 1914-March
30, 1992) was an Indian politician and leader of Communist Party of India. He was the founder secretary of Communist Party of India Bihar unit.

Biography

Early life
He was born on November 16, 1914 in the town of Bhagalpur, Bihar and Orissa Province at his maternal uncle's house. His childhood was spent in Munger. His father Nirapada Mukherjee was a pleader, later settled down in Munger, becoming a workers’ and
Congress leader. Sunil got admitted in 4th class in 1921-22.

Sunil's uncle Tarapada Mukherjee,
who worked in post office and was a firm nationalist and anti-British, deeply influenced him. Tarapada resigned from his post and began to
work in workers’ union. After his death Sunil's father Nirapada changed completely and joined the Congress after resigning his post. He decided to give everything to Congress and for freedom. He was
arrested in 1930. Later he became parliamentary secretary and a minister in Congress governments and fought many elections, winning all.

Sunil's mother came from the family of Bankim Chandra Chatterjee, who was her uncle.

In Yugantar Party
Yugantar Party of
Bengal had a group in
Munger also, and
located Sunil. Shyama Prasad Majumdar of
Yugantar used to meet
Sunil. It consisted of such
people as Binod Behari
Mukherjee, Anil Moitra,
Gyan Vikash Moitra, Jwala Singh etc. Most of
them were to become
founders of CPI in Bihar.
At the time they used to
gather arms and
ammunitions. They
threw bomb on Munger
police station; Sunil was
with them. Majumdar
supplied books and
literature and they read
about Russian and Irish
revolutions. Sunil
became a firm
revolutionary and a
member of Yugantar
Party in 1929, when he
was a student of Matric
in Munger Zila School.

At the same time Sunil
joined the Congress to
escape arrest. He did
several underground
assignments for the
Congress between 1930
and 1932. Illegal
handbills and pamphlets
were brought out from the underground press
across the Ganges in
north Munger from
Gogri village. They used
to run an Ashram also.
In 1930 mother shifted
to a small house after
Nirapada Mukherjee was
arrested. Yugantar
assigned Sunil to acquire
arms. There was a gun
factory in Munger, where
attempts were made to
acquire some pistols,
revolvers etc, to be sent
to Calcutta.

In Congress session
Sunil Mukherjee attended the Congress session held in Delhi in
1932, in semi-legal conditions. Delegates and workers began to be
arrested soon after arrival.

Sunil took 11 delegates to Delhi, with himself as delegate.
They were instructed to
reach Chandni Chowk at
9 am and begin reading
the document.
Thousands reached
there and began to read
the document. They were
attacked with lathis and
bayonets. A large
number were injured.
They were taken to Camp
Jail outside the city and
were kept interned there
for two months.

After release Sunil reached Calcutta and took admission in Rippon School in Matriculation. His hostel
room became the centre
of revolutionary
activities. He was
arrested in the
‘Cornwallis Street
Shooting Case’ in the
early 30s. Dinesh
Majumdar was hanged
in the case. But Sunil got
benefit of doubt and was
released.

Anderson was the
Bengal governor and
Charles Tegart the police
commissioner, a terror.
Sunil was arrested from
his uncle's house. He was
badly beaten for days
together, was put on ice
slabs, nails were driven
into his fingers and many
other forms of tortures
were applied on him. He
was then shifted to
Presidency jail and detained in a solitary cell.

There he met many prominent persons
including the famous Gopal Haldar. They got engaged in political and
ideological rethinking. They tried to understand Russian revolution,
Bolshevik Party and Lenin. Abdul Halim and Muzaffar Ahmed contacted them.

In Communist Party of India
Sunil was kept in the
same room as Bhupesh Gupta, the future CPI
leader. They remained
together for full four
years, which was to
prove decisive for
Sunil's life. They studied
Marx's Capital, Lenin's
State and Revolution and
other literature. This
went on till mid-1934.

Sunil joined the ‘Communist Consolidation’ formed
in the jail. Sunil became
regular in Marxist
studies. In 1937, he was
sent to ‘village
internment’ to a village
in Phulwaria police
station in Mymensingh
(now in Bangladesh). He
passed his Matric there
at the special exam
centre. He passed his IA
in first class.

After release Sunil
took admission in Patna
University in Patna. He
stayed at the residence of
Bihar chief minister Shri Krishna Sinha. Congress
had formed the ministry
after 1937 elections.
Sunil's father was his
friend. At first he was
denied admission but
the chief minister got
angry and pressed for it.

He got admission in the department of Economics. His head Dr Gyanchand admitted him soon after learning about his revolutionary exploits!

In Patna Sunil came in contact with Ali Ashraf, the AISF leader, Jagannath Sarkar and others.

A Peasant-Worker-Student League was
established in Munger in 1938, headed by Ratan Roy, one of the founders of party in Bihar.

At first Sunil
Mukherjee wanted to go
to Calcutta, but was
instructed not to. He
started an agency for the
central organ the
National Front. P. C. Joshi
asked Sunil to come to
Gaya to kisan conference
in 1939 and asked him to
begin preparations for
party formation in Bihar.

Training in Bombay
Sunil was soon called
to Bombay for 3-month
training in Marxism
meant for party
secretaries. A wide
range of subjects were
taught. Besides P. C. Joshi,
lectures were delivered
by Gangadhar Adhikari, Ajoy Ghosh and R. D. Bhardwaj. The famous historian R. C. Majumdar was present. P. Krishna Pillai from Kerala and Chandrasekharan from Andhra were also present.

Foundation of CPI in Bihar
On return in July, Sunil
began preparations for
foundation of CPI. With
the outbreak of Second
World War in September 1939, the relations
between CSP and CPI
reached a breaking point
due to differences in
interpretation.

After mutual
consultations, a meeting
of available comrades
held in Munger on
October 20, 1939
attended by 20 (twenty)
comrades. Versions
regarding the number
vary but this is the most
accepted one. It was held
in a small house
belonging to elder sister
of Sunil Mukherjee at the
banks of the river Ganga
(the Ganges). It was the
day of Dusshera, which
was a good cover. R. D. Bhradwaj attended on
behalf of CC CPI. Four
among the twenty were
given candidate
membership, the rest full
membership. A five-
member Provincial
Committee (PC) was
formed, consisting of:
Sunil Mukherjee
(secretary), Ali Ashraf,
Rahul Sankrityayana,
Gyan Vikas Moitra and
Binod Mukherjee.

The meeting included some of the future famous names such as Sunil Mukherjee, Ratan Roy, Shiv Bachan Singh, Rahul Sankrityayana,
Vishwanath Mathur etc.

The party in Bihar
announced itself on
January 26, 1940, the
Independence Day. It
distributed handbills
and pamphlets
describing its aims of
freedom, class struggle
and struggle against
imperialism and fascism.
A large number of
strikes took place in
Dalmianagar, Giridih,
Patna, etc. Newspapers
noted that a new, red,
star had risen over Bihar.
The Statesman ‘warned’
against the danger from this new ‘menace’, which
must be crushed quickly.
Sunil Mukherjee, Ali
Ashraf and Rahul were
arrested in March 1940. In
June about 50 were
arrested. The
membership had risen
more than 50 by this time.
Sunil Mukherjee was
sent to Bhagalpur
Central Jail.

In Deoli Camp Jail
He was sent along with 15 others
from Bihar to the infamous Deoli Camp Jail in 1940 along with Ali Ashraf, Rahul, etc. Chandrama Singh, a revolutionary who
became Communist, also
was there. Others
included Yogendra Shukla, Surya Narayan Singh (Socialist) etc.
Sunil Mukherjee was put
up in Camp Number II
(two). Famous
Communist leaders like
S. A. Dange, Ajoy Ghosh,
R. D. Bhardwaj, Soli Batlivala, S. V. Ghate, Dhanwantri and others were there.

Sunil Mukherjee was
already ill when brought
to Deoli. He was taken to
Ajmer for appendix
operation under guard
by Garhwal Regiment. Dr Young treated him.

He was released in July
1942 after treatment in
PMCH, Patna.
Provincial Party office
was set up in Khazanchi
Road, Patna.
Processions of August
1942 movement were
passing through the
streets. Party
membership rose to 336
by beginning of 1943.
People had begun
joining the party. He was
closely associated with
Swami Sahajanand Saraswati, later general
secretary of AIKS,
helping him politically
train up cadres of AIKS
during 1942-44.

Karyanand Sharma
joined CPI in 1940.
Swami Sahajanand was
angry. He told Sunil
Mukherjee: You are
taking away my cadres!
Sunil replied that he was
only training them for
both party and kisan
sabha. Swamiji agreed. A
large number of
outstanding
personalities joined the
party during this period,
such as Yogendra Sharma, Chaturanan Mishra, Bhogendra Jha, Gangadhar Das, Chandrashekhar Singh and many others. By 1944 the party had grown to 4000.

Party did much work during the Bengal famine of 1943-44 which had also affected Bihar severely.

Sunil Mukherjee
attended the first
congress of CPI in
Bombay in May 1943. He
also worked in the TU
field in Jamshedpur,
Dalmianagar, Giridih
etc, helping build the
party.

At the beginning of
1947, the party began
publishing daily
‘Janashakti’. Sunil
Mukherjee married
Shibani Mukherjee, a final
Year medical student and
party member since 1946, in
May 1947.

He was sent to Dhanbad among the coal workers. All India Coal Workers Federation was organized with S. A. Dange as president and Sunil Mukherjee general secretary.

In Bihar Assembly
Party put up Sunil
Mukherjee as candidate
for Assembly in 1962
elections. He won by 7
thousand votes. CPI won
12 assembly seats. A Lok
Sabha seat was also won
from Jamshedpur. Sunil
Mukherjee was elected
leader of CPI assembly
group. He delivered
effective speeches.

Split in the party in
1964 did not affect it
much in Bihar.

Work in communal riots in Jamshedpur, 1964
There were severe
riots in Jamshedpur in
1964. The Tatas with the
help of communal forces
organized them. They
were among the most
horrible ones. Sunil
Mukherjee, Kedar Das and others worked very
hard to restore peace.
Sunil helped the
authorities to locate the
centres of communal
elements wherefrom they
organized the riots.

Arrest in 1965
Sunil Mukherjee was
very active during the
anti-Congress wave of
the 1960s. He and Ram
Manohar Lohia were
arrested in 1965. Many
leaders were beaten and
arrested in Patna Gandhi
Maidan.

Samyukta Vidhayak Dal government was formed in 1967. Dr Lohia
offered Sunil Mukherjee
the chief ministership,
but the latter declined as
this would create
controversy: Samyukta
Socialist Party (SSP) was
the biggest party in the
coalition. Meetings of the
Samyukta Vidhayak Dal used to be held at
Sunil Mukherjee's
residence. It was he who
conveyed the decision to
make Mahamaya Pd
Singh the CM: he was
happy beyond words!
There were proposals to
make Sunil Mukherjee
too a minister but he
refused.

He was the leader of
CPI group in Assembly
in 1962-67 and 1969-77.
He was leader of
opposition during 1973-77.

Secretary of party again
Sunil Mukherjee was
elected secretary of Bihar
CPI after Bhatinda
congress (1978), from
1978 to 1984. He was
member of central
executive committee
(CEC) of CPI from 1978 to
1984. Earlier he was also
CC member in united
party.

He died on March 30, 1992, after prolonged illness.

References

1914 births
1992 deaths
Communist Party of India politicians from Bihar
Bihar MLAs 1962–1967
Bihar MLAs 1969–1972
Bihar MLAs 1972–1977
Members of the Bihar Legislative Council
Leaders of the Opposition in the Bihar Legislative Assembly